Polona may refer to:
 Polona, Polish digital library
 Polona (given name), feminine given name
 Archaeologia Polona, academic journal of archaeology published in English annually since 1958
 Republica Polonă, Romanian language Names of Poland
 Spanish language feminine singular of polono